The following is a list of notable people associated with Somerville College, Oxford, including alumni and fellows of the college. This list consists almost entirely of women, due to the fact that Somerville College was one of the first two women's colleges of the University of Oxford, admitting men for the first time in 1994. The college and its alumni have played a very important role in feminism.

Somervillians include prime ministers Margaret Thatcher and Indira Gandhi, Nobel-Prize-winning scientist Dorothy Hodgkin, television personalities Esther Rantzen and Susie Dent, reformer Cornelia Sorabji, writers Marjorie Boulton, Vera Brittain, A. S. Byatt, Susan Cooper, Penelope Fitzgerald, Alan Hollinghurst, Winifred Holtby, Nicole Krauss, Iris Murdoch and Dorothy L. Sayers, politicians Shirley Williams, Margaret Jay and Sam Gyimah, socialite Lady Ottoline Morrell, Princess Bamba Sutherland and her sister, philosophers G. E. M. Anscombe, Patricia Churchland, Philippa Foot and Mary Midgley, psychologist Anne Treisman, archaeologist Kathleen Kenyon, actress Moon Moon Sen, soprano Emma Kirkby and numerous women's rights activists. It has educated at least 28 dames, 17 heads of Oxford colleges, 11 life peers, 10 MP's, 4 Olympic rowers, 3 of The 50 greatest British writers since 1945, 2 prime ministers, 2 princesses, a queen consort and a Nobel laureate.

Firsts
Somervillians have achieved a good number of "firsts", internationally, nationally and at Oxford University. The most distinguished are the first woman Prime Minister of the United Kingdom Margaret Thatcher, the first and only British woman to win a Nobel Prize in science Dorothy Hodgkin, and the first woman to lead the world's largest democracy Indira Gandhi, Prime Minister of India for much of the 1970s. Others include Cornelia Sorabji, first female lawyer in India and first Indian national to study at any British university; Anne Warburton, first female British ambassador; Constance Coltman, Britain's first woman to be an ordained Anglican minister; Shriti Vadera, Baroness Vadera, first woman to head a major British bank and chair the Royal Shakespeare Company; Evelyn Sharp, Baroness Sharp, first female permanent secretary, and Carys Bannister, first female neurosurgeon in the UK.

Manel Abeysekera, Sri Lanka's first woman diplomat
Ruth Adler, Scotland's first Amnesty International employee
Caroline Alexander, first woman to publish a full-length English translation of Homer's Iliad
Rachel Armitage, first New Zealand woman BA to complete a degree at Oxford
Margaret Ballinger, first President of the Liberal Party of South Africa
Carys Bannister, first female neurosurgeon in the United Kingdom
Farah Bhatti, first British woman of Pakistani origins to be made a cardiac surgeon in the United Kingdom; first Muslim on the council of the Royal College of Surgeons of England Women in Surgery Forum
Susanne Bobzien, first woman to be appointed a tutorial fellow at The Queen's College, Oxford
Lalage Bown, first organizing secretary of the International Congress of Africanists, first woman to receive the William Pearson Tolley Award from Syracuse University
Victoria Braithwaite, first person to demonstrate that fish feel pain
Averil Cameron, first female Warden of Keble College
Gwendolen M. Carter, first female president of the African Studies Association
Margaret Casely-Hayford, first female Chancellor of Coventry University, first black woman to be Partner in a City law firm
Ethel Charles, first woman to be admitted to the Royal Institute of British Architects and, with her sister Bessie, the first woman to study architecture at University College London
Maude Clarke, first female to join Queen's University Belfast’s academic staff
Thérèse Coffey, first female MP for Suffolk Coastal
Susan Cooper, first woman to edit the Oxford undergraduate newspaper Cherwell
Maria Czaplicka, first woman to receive a Mianowski Scholarship and first female lecturer in anthropology at Oxford
Ann Dally, first woman to study medicine at St Thomas' Hospital
Helen Darbishire, first woman to be chair of the faculty board of English at Oxford
Elsbeth Dimsdale, first woman to receive a college fellowship at the University of Cambridge
Barbara Freire-Marreco, one of the first two women to gain a Diploma in Anthropology at Oxford
Geraldine Penrose Fitzgerald, arguably the first Catholic Oxford woman student
Kathleen Fitzpatrick, first associate professor in Australia outside the natural sciences
Fiona Freckleton, won Great Britain's first medal in a major World Championship women's rowing event
Maggie Gee, first female Chair of the Royal Society of Literature (RSL)
Jean Ginsburg, first woman to graduate from St Mary's Hospital Medical School
Rose Graham, first female President of the British Archaeological Association
Gertrud Herzog-Hauser, first Austrian woman to gain a habilitation at university and Vienna’s first university lecturer in classical languages
Agnes Headlam-Morley, first woman to be appointed to a chair at Oxford
Carole Hillenbrand, first non-Muslim to be awarded the King Faisal International Prize for Islamic Studies
Margaret Hills, first female councillor on Stroud District Council
Dorothy Hodgkin, also the first woman to receive maternity pay at Oxford and first female Chancellor of the University of Bristol
Evelyn Irons, first female war correspondent to be decorated with the French Croix de Guerre, first journalist to reach certain WWII war zones and first female Stanhope Medal recipient
Peggy Jackson, first female Archdeacon of Llandaff
Diana Josephson, first woman to lead the National Oceanic and Atmospheric Administration (NOAA) and first female Under Secretary of Commerce for Oceans and Atmosphere
Kathleen Kenyon, first female president of the Oxford University Archaeological Society
Laeticia Kikonyogo, first Ugandan woman to be appointed High Court judge and Chief Magistrate
Alix Kilroy, one of the first two women to have entered the administrative grade of the Civil Service by examination
Akua Kuenyehia, first First Vice-president of the ICC and Ghana's first female law professor
Christine Lee, first female scholar of the Oxford University Medical School
Nemone Lethbridge, first female at Hare Court and one of Britain's first female barristers
Leah L'Estrange Malone, first female chair of the Jewish Labour Movement
Genevieve Lloyd, first female professor of philosophy in Australia
Hilda Lorimer, one of the first three women to participate in an excavation conducted by the British School at Athens
Leah Lowenstein, first woman dean of a co-education medical school in the United States
Margaret Mackworth, 2nd Viscountess Rhondda, first female director of the Institute of Directors
Dorothea Maude, first woman general practitioner in Oxford
Michele Moody-Adams, first woman and the first African-American dean at Columbia University.
Anne Mueller, first female Permanent secretary at HM Treasury
Isobel Munro, first married Fellow at Oxford
Hilda D. Oakeley, first Warden of the new Royal Victoria College and first woman to deliver McGill's annual university lecture
Onora O'Neill, Baroness O'Neill of Bengarve, first female winner of the Berggruen Prize
Daphne Park, Baroness Park of Monmouth, the highest ranking female officer of her time in the British intelligence services (the Queen of Spies)
Inez Pearn, first woman to be awarded the de Osma studentship (for research in Spain) at Oxford
Emily Penrose, first woman to gain a First in Greats (Classics) at Oxford
Adelaide Plumptre, first woman elected chair of the Canadian Red Cross, TBE and first woman to sit in the Toronto Board of Control
Mildred Pope, first woman to hold a readership at Oxford
Lucy Powell, Manchester's first female Labour member of parliament
Evelyn Procter, first female scholar to be admitted to the National Historical Archive of Spain and the Biblioteca Nacional de España
Esther Rantzen, first woman to receive a Dimbleby Award from BAFTA
Elizabeth Anne Reid, world's first advisor on women's affairs to a head of government
Joyce Reynolds, first woman awarded the Kenyon Medal
Katherine Routledge, initiated the first true survey of Easter Island
Diana Rowntree, first architectural writer for The Guardian
Susan M. Scott, first female physicist to win the Prime Minister's Prizes for Science
Margaret Seward, first Oxford female student to be entered for the honour school of Mathematics, one of the first two women students at Oxford studying chemistry, earliest Chemist on staff at the Royal Holloway (of which she was a founding Lecturer) and pioneer woman to obtain a first class in the honour school of Natural Science
Lucy Sichone, first Zambian woman to receive a Rhodes Scholarship and first woman to have her portrait displayed on the walls of the prestigious Rhodes House
Angela Sinclair-Loutit, first female member of the Friends' Ambulance Unit
Premala Sivaprakasapillai Sivasegaram, first female engineer in Sri Lanka
Mary Somerville, first woman controller of a BBC division; first director of BBC School Radio
May Staveley, first warden of Clifton Hill House, Bristol's women's university settlement
Theresa Stewart, first female leader of Birmingham City Council
Lucy Sutherland, first woman undergraduate to speak at the Oxford Union and first female Pro-vice-chancellor of Oxford
Ann Gaynor Taylor, first female Fellow of St Edmund Hall, Oxford
Margerie Venables Taylor, first female vice-president of the Society of Antiquaries of London
Claire Tomlinson, highest-rated female polo player, first woman to win the County Cup and the Queen's Cup, first woman in the world to rise to five goals, first female player in The Varsity Polo Match and first female captain of the OUPC
Lady Juliet Townsend, first female Lord Lieutenant of Northamptonshire
Anne Treisman, first woman to win the Golden Brain Award
Pamela Vandyke-Price, first British woman to write about wine and spirits
Marcia Wilkinson, first recipient of the Elizabeth Garrett Anderson Award for her extraordinary contribution to relieving the burden of those affected by headache
Jean Wilks, first female Pro-Chancellor of Birmingham University
Audrey Williams, first woman president of the Royal Institution of South Wales
Shirley Williams, Baroness Williams of Crosby, first woman chair of the Oxford University Labour Club and first SDP MP
Dorothy Maud Wrinch, first female Lecturer in Mathematics at Oxford and first woman to receive an Oxford DSc
Mai Yamani, first Saudi Arabian woman to obtain a M.St. and a D.Phil. from Oxford

Alumni

Activists and feminists

Ruth Adler (1944–1994), feminist, human rights campaigner and child welfare advocate; founder of Amnesty International's Scotland and of Scottish Women's Aid and helped to establish the Scottish Child Law Centre
Rachel Armitage (1873–1955), New Zealand welfare worker and community leader; first New Zealand woman BA to complete a degree at Oxford
Alison Assiter FRSA FAcSS (1949), Professor of Feminist Theory
Jasodhara Bagchi (1937–2015), leading Indian feminist critic and activist
Jane Esdon Brailsford (1874–1937), Scottish suffragette
Vera Brittain (1893–1970), Voluntary Aid Detachment (VAD) nurse, writer, feminist, and pacifist; author of Testament of Youth
Stella Browne (1880–1955), Canadian-born feminist, socialist, sex radical, and birth control campaigner; one of the first women to speak out in somewhat offensive ways about her beliefs with a "Forward, Charge!" approach
Cicely Corbett Fisher (1885–1959), suffragist and workers' rights activist
Ann Dummett (1930–2012), activist, campaigner for racial justice and published author
Honora Enfield (1882–1935), co-operative activist and founder of the International Women's Co-operative Guild
Lilian Faithfull CBE (1865–1952), teacher, headmistress, women's rights advocate, magistrate, social worker and humanitarian; one of the "Steamboat ladies" who were part of the struggle for women to gain university education
Lettice Fisher (1875–1956), founder of the National Council for the Unmarried Mother and her Child, now known as Gingerbread; wife of H. A. L. Fisher
Dame Evelyn Fox DBE (1874–1955), noted health worker and driving force for the creation of the British Epilepsy Association (BEA) and National Association for Mental Health (now Mind)
Julia Gasper, independent academic specialising in historical literature, and a right-wing political activist affiliated with the English Democrats
Katie Ghose (1970), campaigner and lawyer; Chief Executive of the Women's Aid Federation of England and former Chief Executive of the Electoral Reform Society
Margaret Hills (1882–1967), teacher, suffragist organiser, feminist and socialist; first female councillor on Stroud District Council
Clare Hodges (1957–2011), activist who advanced the medical understanding of cannabis and campaigned for its widespread benefit as a therapeutic medicine
Winifred Holtby (1898–1935), novelist, journalist and suffragist, now best known for her novel South Riding and editor of the feminist magazine Time and Tide. The rights to the book were given to Somerville by Holtby on her death. The Winifred Holtby Memorial Prize was named after her.
Svava Jakobsdóttir (1930–2004), one of Iceland's foremost 20th-century authors and feminist politicians
Gurmehar Kaur (1996), Indian student activist and author of Small Acts of Freedom; included by Time Magazine in their "10 Next Generation Leaders" list for 2017
Judith Kazantzis (1940–2018), poet and political and social activist
Genevieve Lloyd (1941), Australian philosopher and feminist; first female Professor of Philosophy in Australia; author of The Man of Reason
Florence MacAulay (1862–1945), suffragist; wrote the lyrics to The Women's Marseillaise
Margaret Mackworth, 2nd Viscountess Rhondda (1883–1958), Welsh peeress, businesswoman, significant suffragette, RMS Lusitania survivor, first female director of the Institute of Directors, founder of Time and Tide and the Six Point Group
Jenny Manson (1948), British Jewish activist, author, former civil servant, Labour Party councillor and Chair of Jewish Voice for Labour
Christabel Marshall (1871–1960), campaigner for women's suffrage; playwright and author
Jean Medawar (1913–2005), author; former chairman of the Family Planning Association; wife of Nobelist Sir Peter Brian Medawar
Eddie Ndopu (1990), Namibian human rights and disability advocate; recognized by Pacific Standard as one of their "top 30 thinkers under 30", by Shaw Trust and Powerful Media as one of the 50 most influential people with disabilities in the world, and by South Africa's Mail & Guardian as one of their "top 200 young South Africans"
Ann Oakley (1944), sociologist, feminist, and writer; author of The Men's Room
Adelaide Plumptre (1874–1948), Canadian activist, diplomat, and municipal politician in Toronto; first woman elected chair of the Canadian Red Cross, Toronto Board of Education; first woman to sit in the Toronto Board of Control
Margaret Pyke (1893–1937), family planning activist and pioneer; founding member of the British National Birth Control Committee (NBCC), later known as the Family Planning Association (FPA)
Eleanor Rathbone MP (1872–1946), independent MP; long-term campaigner for family allowance and for women's rights; member of the Rathbone family; Somerville's first MP
Elizabeth Anne Reid AO FASSA (1942), Australian development practitioner, feminist and academic; world's first advisor on women's affairs to a head of government
Lucy Sichone (1954–1998), Zambian civil rights activist; first Zambian woman to receive a Rhodes Scholarship; first woman to have her portrait displayed on the walls of the prestigious Rhodes House
Angela Sinclair-Loutit (1921–2016), social justice activist, pacifist and nurse; first female member of the Friends' Ambulance Unit.
Princess Catherine Hilda Duleep Singh (1871–1942), daughter of Maharaja Duleep Singh and suffragist
Cornelia Sorabji (1866–1954), first woman to practice law in India and Britain; first Indian national to study at any British university
Radhabai Subbarayan (1891–1960), first female member of the Indian Council of States (Rajya Sabha)
Farhana Yamin (1965), lawyer, public speaker and climate activist

Architects
Bessie Charles (1869–1932), architect; with her sister Ethel the first woman to study architecture at University College London
Ethel Charles (1871–1962), architect; first woman to be admitted to the Royal Institute of British Architects
Diana Rowntree (1915–2008), architect and architectural writer; first architectural writer for The Guardian

Archivists
Sonia Anderson FRHistS FSA (1944–2020), archivist
Alice Prochaska FRHistS (1947), former archivist and librarian; Principal of Somerville College
Joan Sinar FRHistS (1925–2015), archivist who set up the county record offices for Devon and Derbyshire

Artists
Fanchon Fröhlich (1922 – 2020), American artist
Holly Somerville, botanical artist

Authors

Janet Adam Smith OBE (1905–1999), writer, editor, literary journalist and champion of Scottish literature; assistant editor of The Listener
Caroline Alexander (1956), American author and classicist; first woman to publish a full-length English translation of Homer's Iliad
Jo Baker (1973), writer; author of Longbourn
Elspeth Barker (1940), Scottish novelist and journalist
Reem Bassiouney (1973), Egyptian author and professor of sociolinguistics; Sawiris Cultural Award winner
Nina Bawden CBE FRSL JP (1925–2012), novelist and children's writer; shortlisted for the Booker Prize and Lost Man Booker Prize; one of very few who have both served as a Booker judge and made a Booker shortlist as an author; winner of the Guardian Prize and Phoenix Award
Lucy M. Boston (1892–1990), novelist who wrote for children and adults; best known for her "Green Knowe" series; winner of the Carnegie Medal
Marjorie Boulton (1924–2017), author and poet writing in both English and Esperanto
Vera Brittain (1893–1970), Voluntary Aid Detachment (VAD) nurse, writer, feminist, and pacifist; author of Testament of Youth
Christine Brooke-Rose (1923–2012), writer and literary critic, known principally for her later, experimental novels
Dame A. S. Byatt DBE HonFBA (1936), novelist, poet and Booker Prize and Erasmus Prize winner; one of The 50 greatest British writers since 1945; author of Possession: A Romance
Anne Crone (1915–1972), Irish novelist and teacher
Rosemary Dinnage (1928–2015), author and critic; listed by The Observer as one of Britain's top 300 intellectuals in 2011
Gertrude Minnie Faulding (1875–1961), novelist and children's writer
Geraldine Penrose Fitzgerald (1846–1939), Irish novelist and catholic convert; arguably the first Catholic Oxford woman student
Penelope Fitzgerald (1916–2000), writer, Booker Prize winner, one of The 50 greatest British writers since 1945; her final novel, The Blue Flower is seen as one of "the ten best historical novels" and won the National Book Critics Circle Award
Margaret Forster (1938–2016), novelist, biographer, memoirist, historian and literary critic; author of Georgy Girl and Diary of an Ordinary Woman
Charis Frankenburg (1892–1985), author; one of the first women eligible for a degree from the University of Oxford; founder of one of the first birth control clinics in England outside London
Celia Fremlin (1914–2009), writer of mystery fiction; winner of the Edgar Award
Maggie Gee OBE FRSL (1948), novelist, one of six women among the 20 writers on the Granta Best of Young British Novelists list in 1983; first female Chair of the Royal Society of Literature (RSL)
Victoria Glendinning CBE (1937), biographer, critic, broadcaster and novelist; honorary vice-president of English PEN; winner of the James Tait Black Memorial Prize; Vice-president of the Royal Society of Literature
Judith Grossman, American writer
Alix Hawley (1975), Canadian novelist
Emma Henderson (1958), author; shortlisted for the Women's Prize for Fiction
Joanna Hines (1949), writer
Jane Aiken Hodge (1917–2009), American-born writer, daughter of Conrad Aiken
Winifred Holtby (1898–1935), novelist, journalist and suffragist, now best known for her novel South Riding and editor of the feminist magazine Time and Tide. The rights to the book were given to Somerville by Holtby on her death. The Winifred Holtby Memorial Prize was named after her.
Muriel Jaeger (1892–1969), author who wrote early novels of science fiction as well as plays and non-fiction
Svava Jakobsdóttir (1930–2004), one of Iceland's foremost 20th Century authors and feminist politicians
Liz Jensen FRSL (1959), novelist
Daisy Johnson (1990), writer; youngest author to be shortlisted for the Booker Prize; winner of the Edge Hill Short Story Prize
Margaret Kennedy (1896–1967), novelist and playwright; author of The Constant Nymph
Nicole Krauss (1974), American author best known for her four novels Man Walks Into a Room, The History of Love, Great House and Forest Dark (which won an award from the Anisfield-Wolf Book Awards); selected as one of The New Yorker's "20 Under 40" writers to watch.
Marghanita Laski (1915–1988), journalist, radio panellist and novelist
Margaret Leigh (1894–1973), writer who lived extensively in Scotland and wrote about life in crofting communities
Gillian Linscott (1944), author and winner of the CWA Historical Dagger
Dame Rose Macaulay DBE (1881–1958), writer, most noted for her novel The Towers of Trebizond; James Tait Black Memorial Prize winner
Elizabeth Macneal (1988), author known for her book The Doll Factorý
Amphilis Throckmorton Middlemore (1891–1931), British writer and teacher
Dame Iris Murdoch DBE (1919–1999), novelist and philosopher born in Ireland; twelfth on a list of The 50 greatest British writers since 1945 and winner of the Booker Prize; author of Under the Net, listed in the Modern Library 100 Best Novels
Kathleen Nott FRSL (1905–1999), poet, novelist, critic, philosopher and editor
Christine Orr (1899–1963), Scottish novelist, playwright, poet, actor, theatre director and broadcaster; one of the "uninvited eight" instrumental in the founding of the Edinburgh Festival Fringe; one of only three women making a salary over £500 at the BBC before WWII
Inez Pearn (1913–1976), novelist
Hilda Stewart Reid (1898–1982), novelist and historian
Michèle Roberts (1949), novelist and poet; shortlisted for the Booker Prize and Chevalier de l'Ordre des Arts et des Lettres
Constance Savery (1897–1999), author of novels and children's books 
Dorothy L. Sayers (1893–1957), crime writer, poet and playwright; creator of Lord Peter Wimsey; translated Dante's Divine Comedy
Neil Spring (1981), Welsh novelist of supernatural horror, known for his bestselling book The Ghost Hunters (2013)
Hilary Spurling CBE FRSL (1940), writer, journalist and biographer; winner of the Whitbread Prize
Alexander Starritt (1985), Scottish-German novelist, journalist and entrepreneur
Sylvia Thompson (1902–1968), novelist, writer and public speaker
Doreen Wallace (1897–1989), novelist, grammar school teacher and social campaigner
Laura Wilson (1964), crime-writer; winner of the Prix du Polar Européen and CWA Historical Dagger and shortlisted for the Gold Dagger
Elizabeth Young, Lady Kennet (1923–2014), writer, researcher, poet, artist, campaigner, analyst and questioning commentator

Children's writers

Nina Bawden CBE FRSL JP (1925–2012), novelist and children's writer; shortlisted for the Booker Prize and Lost Man Booker Prize; one of very few to serve both as a Booker judge and make a Booker shortlist as an author; winner of the Guardian Prize and Phoenix Award
Lucy M. Boston (1892–1990), novelist who wrote for children and adults; best known for her "Green Knowe" series; winner of the Carnegie Medal
Pauline Clarke (1921–2013), author who wrote for younger children; best known for her The Twelve and the Genii; winner of the Carnegie Medal, Deutscher Jugendliteraturpreis and Lewis Carroll Shelf Award
Olivia Coolidge (1908–2006), British-born American children's writer and educator; runner-up for the Newbery Medal
Susan Cooper (1935), author of children's books including The Dark Is Rising; winner of the Newbery Medal and Margaret A. Edwards Award; first woman to edit the Oxford undergraduate newspaper Cherwell
Gillian Cross (1945), author of children's books; winner of the Carnegie Medal and Costa Book Award; author of The Demon Headmaster
Gertrude Minnie Faulding (1875–1961), novelist and children's writer
Frances Hardinge (1973), children's writer; author of Fly by Night and The Lie Tree; winner of the Branford Boase Award and Costa Book Award
Clare Mallory (1913–1991), children's writer from New Zealand
Constance Savery (1897–1999), author of novels and children's books 
Ann Schlee FRSL (1934), novelist and children's writer; winner of the Guardian Children's Fiction Prize, shortlisted for the Booker Prize and runner up for the Carnegie Medal
Matthew Skelton (1971), English Canadian writer; author of Endymion Spring
Jenifer Wayne (1917–1982), author of children's literature

Playwrights

Marcy Kahan, Canadian-American playwright and radio dramatist; winner of the Edinburgh Comedy Award and a Silver Radio Academy Award
Margaret Kennedy (1896–1967), novelist and playwright; author of The Constant Nymph
Nemone Lethbridge (1932), barrister and playwright; one of Britain's first female barristers and the first woman at Hare Court
Christine Longford, Countess of Longford (1900–1980), playwright; wife of Edward Pakenham, 6th Earl of Longford
Christabel Marshall (1871–1960), LGBT campaigner for women's suffrage; playwright and author
Peter Morris (1973), American playwright; writer of Guardians

Poets
Audrey Beecham (1915–1989), poet, teacher and historian, niece of the composer; Maurice Bowra, Warden of Wadham and Vice-Chancellor of Oxford was engaged to her
Catherine Byron (1947), Irish poet who often collaborates with visual and sound artists
Viola Garvin (1898–1969), poet and literary editor at The Observer; Robert E. Howard used lines from her "The House of Cæsar" for his suicide note
Judith Kazantzis (1940–2018), poet and political and social activist; daughter of Lord and Lady Longford
May Kendall (1861–1943), poet, novelist, and satirist
Aaron Maniam (1979), award-winning poet and civil servant
Elma Mitchell (1919–2000), poet; winner of the Cholmondeley Award
Denise Riley (1948), poet and philosopher; winner of the Forward Poetry Prize
Nesca Robb FRSL (1905–1976), Irish poet, writer and historian scholar; member of the Maatschappij der Nederlandse Letterkunde
E. J. Scovell (1907–1999), poet
Margaret Stanley-Wrench (1916–1974), poet and novelist
Kim Taplin (1943), poet and non-fiction writer
Helen Waddell (1889–1965), Irish poet, translator and playwright; winner of the Benson Medal

Business people

Marjorie Abbatt (1899–1991), toy maker and businesswoman; President of the International Council for Children's Play
Goga Ashkenazi (1980), Kazakh businesswoman and socialite; head of Vionnet; close friend of Prince Andrew, Duke of York
Margaret Casely-Hayford (1959), lawyer and businesswoman; chairs the board of Shakespeare's Globe; former chair of ActionAid; first female Chancellor of Coventry University; first black woman to be Partner in a City law firm
Angela Dean, banker and trustee; one of the '100 women to watch' in the Female FTSE Board Report in 2013 and 2014; managing director of Morgan Stanley; Chair of the International House London
Cindy Gallop (1960), advertising consultant, founder and former chair of the US branch of advertising firm Bartle Bogle Hegarty; founder of the IfWeRanTheWorld and MakeLoveNotPorn companies
Suzanne Heywood (1969), executive and former civil servant; chair of CNH Industrial
Catherine Powell (1967), businesswoman, President of the Disney Parks, Western Region, where she oversees Disneyland, Walt Disney World, and Disneyland Paris
Shriti Vadera, Baroness Vadera PC (1962), investment banker and politician; government minister and Chairwoman of Santander UK; first woman to head a major British bank; first woman and first person of colour to chair the Royal Shakespeare Company

Civil servants and diplomats

Manel Abeysekera (1933), Sri Lanka's first woman career diplomat and ambassador
Alyson Bailes CMG (1949–2016), diplomat, political scientist, academic and polyglot
Gill Bennett, Chief Historian of the Foreign and Commonwealth Office between 1995 and 2005
Dame Gillian Brown DCVO CMG (1923–1999), diplomat; second woman to be a British ambassador
Dame Alix Kilroy DBE (1903–1999), one of the first two women to have entered the administrative grade of the civil service by examination (in 1925); founding member of the SDP
Emily Maltman, British Ambassador to the Democratic Republic of Congo
Aaron Maniam (1979), award-winning poet and civil servant
Dame Rosalind Marsden DCMG (1950), diplomat and public servant; Ambassador and EUSR of Sudan
Dame Anne Mueller DCB (1930–2000), civil servant and academic; first woman to become a Permanent Secretary at HM Treasury; Chancellor of De Montfort University
Nozipho Mxakato-Diseko (1956), South African diplomat, currently the United Nations Ambassador for South Africa; for the Paris Agreement she was the leader of the G77 bloc during negotiations
Adelaide Plumptre (1874–1948), Canadian activist, diplomat, and municipal politician in Toronto First woman elected chair of the Canadian Red Cross, Toronto Board of Education; first woman to sit in the Toronto Board of Control
Jill Rutter, civil servant
Dame Evelyn Sharp, Baroness Sharp GBE (1903–1985), civil servant; first woman to hold the position of Permanent Secretary
Emma Sky OBE (1968), expert on the Middle East; political advisor to General Ray Odierno
Ruth Thompson (1953–1916), civil servant; director of finance of Higher Education at the DES
Dame Anne Warburton DCVO CMG (1927–2015), diplomat; first female British ambassador; President of Lucy Cavendish College, Cambridge
Carrie Yau (1955), Hong Kong government official; executive director of the Vocational Training Council

Education

Jane Aaron (1951), Welsh educator, literary researcher and writer
Marian Gertrude Beard (1885–1958), Irish-born educator and translator; headmistress of Putney High School
Lalage Bown (1927), educator; first organizing secretary of the International Congress of Africanists; first woman to receive the William Pearson Tolley Award from Syracuse University
Alice Bruce (1867–1951), educator and school administrator; long serving staff member of Somerville Hall and President of Aberdare Hall in Cardiff
Dame Elan Closs Stephens DBE (1948), Welsh educator and the Wales representative on the BBC Board
Agnes de Selincourt (1872–1917), Christian missionary in India, responsible for the founding of missions; first Principal of Lady Muir Memorial College, Allahabad, India; Principal of Westfield College, London
Donalda Dickie (1883–1972), Canadian normal school teacher; winner of the Governor General's Award for English-language children's literature
Flora Forster (1896–1981), Welsh educator and author
Ethel Hurlbatt (1866–1934), Principal of Bedford College, London; first President of Aberdare Hall in Cardiff; later Warden of Royal Victoria College, the women's college of McGill University, in Montreal, Canada
Julia Huxley (1862–1908), founded Prior's Field School for girls; the game word ladder was devised for her
Dame Tamsyn Imison DBE (1937–2017), educator and "educational strategist"; headteacher of the Hampstead School
Sonia Jackson (1934), Emeritus Professor at the UCL Institute of Education; specialised in Early Childhood Education and Care (ECEC)
Lettice Jowitt (1878–1962), educationist and refugee worker; pioneer in the settlement movement
Jane Kirkaldy (1869–1932), science educator at various schools in Oxford for 36 years; one of the first women to obtain first-class honors in the natural sciences; contributed greatly to the education of the generation of English women scientists
Edith Marvin (1872–1958), inspector of schools
Michele Moody-Adams, philosopher; first female and first African-American dean of Columbia University
Dame Anne Mueller DCB (1930–2000), civil servant and academic; first woman to become a Permanent Secretary at HM Treasury; Chancellor of De Montfort University
Elisabeth Murray FRHistS FSA (1909–1998), English biographer and educationist
Hilda D. Oakeley (1867–1950), philosopher, educationalist and author; first Warden of the new Royal Victoria College; first woman to deliver McGill's annual university lecture
May Staveley (1863–1934), first warden of Bristol's women's university settlement (Clifton Hill House); head of the women's hall of residence at Liverpool University; president of the Bristol branch of the International Federation of University Women
Jean Wilks (1917–2014), headmistress at The Hertfordshire and Essex High School and King Edward VI High School for Girls; first female Pro-Chancellor of Birmingham University
Olive Willis (1877–1964), educationist and headmistress; founded Downe House School and was its head

Oxbridge heads of houses
Mary Bennett (1913–2005), academic and Principal of St Hilda's College, Oxford; daughter of H. A. L. Fisher and Lettice Fisher
Dame Averil Cameron DBE FSA FBA FRHistS (1940), professor emerita of Late Antique and Byzantine History; former Warden of Keble College, Oxford; second woman to receive the Kenyon Medal
Elizabeth Millicent Chilver (1914–2014), Principal of Bedford College, London and Lady Margaret Hall, Oxford
Barbara Craig (1915–2005), archaeologist, classicist; Principal of Somerville College
Helen Darbishire CBE FBA (1881–1961), literary scholar and Principal of Somerville College
Margery Fry (1874–1958), prison reformer; one of the first women to become a magistrate; Secretary of the Howard League for Penal Reform; Principal of Somerville College
Grace Eleanor Hadow OBE (1875–1940), author, principal of what would become St Anne's College, Oxford, and vice-chairman of the Women's Institute
Dame Kathleen Kenyon DBE (1906–1978), leading archaeologist of Neolithic culture in the Fertile Crescent, best known for her excavations of Jericho; has been called one of the most influential archaeologists of the 20th century; refined the Wheeler-Kenyon method; Principal of St Hugh's College, Oxford
Julia de Lacy Mann (1891–1985), economic historian and Principal of St Hilda's College, Oxford
Onora O'Neill, Baroness O'Neill of Bengarve CH CBE FRS FBA FMedSci (1941), philosopher; first female winner of the Berggruen Prize; crossbench member of the House of Lords; Principal of Newnham College, Cambridge
Daphne Park, Baroness Park of Monmouth CMG OBE FRSA (1921–2010), spy, clandestine senior controller in MI6; Principal of Somerville College
Dame Emily Penrose DBE (1858–1942), Principal of Royal Holloway College, Bedford College and Somerville College; first woman to gain a First in Greats (Classics) at Oxford
Alice Prochaska FRHistS (1947), former archivist and librarian; Principal of Somerville College
Evelyn Procter FRHistS (1897–1980), historian and academic; Principal of St Hugh's College, Oxford; first female scholar to be admitted to the National Historical Archive of Spain and the Biblioteca Nacional de España
Dame Lucy Sutherland DBE FBA FRSA (1903–1980), Australian-born historian and head of Lady Margaret Hall, Oxford
Dame Janet Vaughan DBE FRS (1899–1993), physiologist, academic and Principal of Somerville College; one of the first doctors to enter Bergen-Belsen concentration camp after the liberation
Dame Anne Warburton DCVO CMG (1927–2015), diplomat; first female British ambassador; President of Lucy Cavendish College, Cambridge

Fictional
Gwen Stacy from Spider-Man went to Somerville to study medicine in The Amazing Spider-Man 2.
Harriet Vane from Gaudy Night, studied English. Undergraduate at Shrewsbury College, based on Dorothy L. Sayers' own Somerville College.
The wife of Master Keaton studied mathematics.
Mary, Marie, Margaret and Myfanwy from Larkin's Michaelmas Term at St Bride's
Grace Ritchie, the protagonist in Slave of the Passion by Deirdre Wilson
Helena Warner from A Likeness in Stone by Julia Wallis Martin, was a student of Somerville.

Film and theatre

Daphne Alexander, Cypriot/British actress best known for playing Nadia Talianos in the BBC Drama series Casualty and Modesty Blaise in three BBC radio adaptations
Lucinda Coxon (1962), playwright and screenwriter
Lucienne Hill (1923–2012), French-English translator and actor; winner of the Evening Standard Theatre Award and Tony Award
Penelope Houston (1927–2015), film critic and journal editor; edited Sight & Sound for almost 35 years
Martin Desmond Roe, British-American film and television director, writer and producer, best known for Buzkashi Boys (nominated for an Oscar); nominee for the Oscar for Best Live Action Short Film for Two Distant Strangers (2020) at the 93rd Academy Awards
Tessa Ross CBE (1961), film producer and executive; received the BAFTA Outstanding British Contribution to Cinema Award and was named as one of the 100 most powerful women in the United Kingdom by Woman's Hour in 2013; executive producer of 12 Years a Slave, 127 Hours, Billy Elliot and Ex Machina
Moon Moon Sen (1954), Indian Bollywood film actress; winner of the Nandi Award for Best Supporting Actress and Kalakar Award for Best Actress

Health professionals

Heather Ashton FRCP (1929–2019), psychopharmacologist and physician best known for her clinical and research work on benzodiazepene dependence
Carys Bannister OBE (1935–2010), first female neurosurgeon in the United Kingdom
Farah Bhatti OBE, cardiac surgeon and professor; Chair of the Royal College of Surgeons of England Women in Surgery Forum; first British woman of Pakistani origins to be made a cardiac surgeon in the United Kingdom
Lady Eileen Crofton MBE (1919–2010), physician and author; best known for her anti-smoking campaigns
Jean Ginsburg (1926–2004), physician and physiologist; first woman to graduate from St Mary's Hospital Medical School
Christine Lee, medical researcher; first female scholar of the Oxford University Medical School
Leah Lowenstein (1930–1984), American nephrologist and academic administrator; first woman dean of a co-education medical school in the United States
Dorothea Maude (1879–1959), physician and surgeon; first woman general practitioner in Oxford
Helen Muir CBE FRS (1920–2005), rheumatologist; best known for pioneering work into the causes of osteoarthritis
June Raine CBE FRCP (1952), Chief Executive of the Medicines and Healthcare products Regulatory Agency (MHRA), at the time when the MHRA was the first regulator to approve an mRNA vaccine for use in humans, and the first Western regulator to approve a COVID-19 vaccine
Dame Janet Vaughan DBE FRS (1899–1993), physiologist, academic and Principal of Somerville College; one of the first doctors to enter Bergen-Belsen concentration camp after the liberation
Marcia Wilkinson FRCP (1919–2013), neurologist; made a significant contribution to the understanding and surgical treatment of carpal tunnel syndrome; established a rehabilitation unit for disabled young people; first recipient of the Elizabeth Garrett Anderson Award
Cicely Williams OM Jamaica, CMG, FRCP (1893–1992), Jamaican physician, most notable for her discovery and research into kwashiorkor

Mental health professionals
 
Nina Coltart (1927–1997), psychoanalyst, psychotherapist, and essayist; Vice President of the British Psychoanalytical Society
Ann Dally (1926–2007), author and psychiatrist; first woman to study medicine at St Thomas' Hospital
Suzanne Higgs, psychologist and editor-in-chief of the journal Appetite
Barbara Tizard FBA FBPsS (1926–2015), psychologist and academic, specialising in developmental psychology
Anne Treisman (1935–2018), psychologist who specialised in cognitive psychology; developed the feature integration theory and attenuation theory; awarded the National Medal of Science, Grawemeyer Award and first woman to receive the Golden Brain Award

Journalism
Rose George, journalist and author of The Big Necessity
Evelyn Irons (1900–2000), Scottish journalist, first female war correspondent to be decorated with the French Croix de Guerre; first journalist to reach certain WWII war zones; first female Stanhope Medal recipient
Marghanita Laski (1915–1988), journalist, radio panellist and novelist
Ty McCormick, American author, editor, and foreign correspondent
Dilys Powell CBE (1901–1995), journalist who wrote for The Sunday Times
Anne Scott-James, Lady Lancaster (1913–2009), journalist and author; one of Britain's first women career journalists, editors and columnists
Alexander Starritt (1985), Scottish-German novelist, journalist and entrepreneur
Auriol Stevens (1940), journalist, and former editor of the Times Higher Education Supplement
Rachel Sylvester (1969), political journalist who writes for The Times; 2015's Political Journalist of the Year at the British Press Awards and 2016 Journalist of the Year by the Political Studies Association
Daniel Tudor, author, journalist and entrepreneur
Kati Whitaker, BBC and independent radio and TV journalist
Audrey Withers OBE (1905–2001), journalist; edited Vogue

Historians

Irena Backus, Polish historian
Jane Caplan (1945), historian specialising in Nazi Germany and the history of the documentation of individual identity; helped establish one of Britain's first courses in Women's Studies
Muriel St. Clare Byrne (1895–1983), historical researcher, specializing in the Tudor period and the reign of Henry VIII
Catherine Glyn Davies (1926–2007), Welsh historian of philosophy and linguistics; translator
Claire Donovan FSA RA FRHistS (1948–2019), historian and academic
Bonnie Effros FRHistS, Chaddock Chair of Economic and Social History at the University of Liverpool
Dorothea Ewart (1870-1956), historian and author of books on Italian history
Kathleen Fitzpatrick AO (1905–1990), Australian academic and historian; first associate professor in Australia outside the natural sciences
Rose Graham (1875–1963), religious historian and first female President of the British Archaeological Association; her early work on ecclesiastical history is seen as a great foundation for later scholarship on women's history
Alice Greenwood (1862–1935), historian, teacher and writer; second headteacher of Withington Girls' School
Agnes Headlam-Morley (1902–1986), historian and academic; first woman to be appointed to a chair at Oxford
Carole Hillenbrand CBE FBA FRAS FRSE FRHistSoc (1943), Emerita Professor in Islamic History; first non-Muslim to be awarded the King Faisal International Prize for Islamic Studies
M. D. R. Leys (1890–1967), historian and academic
C. D. M. Ketelbey (1896–1990), historian and academic. Author of 'A History of Modern Times'; sister to composer Albert Ketelbey 
Julia de Lacy Mann (1891–1985), economic historian and Principal of St Hilda's College, Oxford
Margaret Mann Phillips (1906–1987), academic who specialized in Renaissance literature and history
Phoebe Pool (1913–1971), art historian and spy for the Soviet Union
Mary Caroline Moorman (1905–1994), historian and biographer; daughter of G. M. Trevelyan; winner of the James Tait Black Memorial Prize
Jane Robinson (1959), social historian specialising in the study of women pioneers in various fields
Emma Georgina Rothschild CMG (1948), economic historian and professor of history at Harvard University; wife of Nobel laureate Amartya Sen; member of the Rothschild family
Zuzanna Shonfield (1919–2000), Polish-born British historian and writer
Kate Williams (1978), author, historian and television presenter
Mary Woodall (1901–1988), art historian, museum director, and Thomas Gainsborough scholar

Classicists and archaeologists

Caroline Alexander (1956), American author and classicist; first woman to publish a full-length English translation of Homer's Iliad
Polymnia Athanassiadi, Greek Professor Emerita in Late Antique History
Dame Averil Cameron DBE FSA FBA FRHistS (1940), professor emerita of Late Antique and Byzantine History; former Warden of Keble College, Oxford; second woman to receive the Kenyon Medal
Dorothy Charlesworth FSA (1927–1981), Roman archaeologist and glass specialist; served as Inspector of Ancient Monuments
Gillian Clark FBA, Emeritus Professor of Classics and Ancient History
Barbara Craig (1915–2005), archaeologist, classicist; Principal of Somerville College
A. M. Dale FBA (1901–1967), classicist and academic
Claudine Dauphin FSA (1950), French archaeologist specialising in the Byzantine period
Elaine Fantham (1933–2016), British-Canadian classicist; President of the American Philological Association
Miriam T. Griffin (1935–2018), American classical scholar; held the first Women in Classics dinner (at Somerville College)
Jill Harries, Emeritus Professor in Ancient History, known for her work on late antiquity
Isobel Henderson (1906–1967), ancient historian; one of the first woman tutors to be allowed to join Oxford's 'Ancient History Dinners'
Margaret Hubbard (1924–2011), Australian-born British classical scholar specialising in philology; described as "one of the most distinguished classical scholars of the modern age"; one of St Anne's College's 15 founding fellows
Helen Hughes-Brock (1938), Minoan and Mycenaean archaeologist
Sarah C. Humphreys, classical scholar
Dame Kathleen Kenyon DBE (1906–1978), leading archaeologist of Neolithic culture in the Fertile Crescent, best known for her excavations of Jericho; has been called one of the most influential archaeologists of the 20th century; refined the Wheeler-Kenyon method; Principal of St Hugh's College, Oxford
Donna Carol Kurtz (1943), American classicist specializing in Greek art; first Beazley Archivist at the Ashmolean Museum
Maria Millington Lathbury (1856-1944), classical scholar, archaeologist and numismatist; mother-in-law of Arthur Evans
Irene Lemos FSA, classical archaeologist specialising in the Late Bronze Age and Early Iron Age of Greece
Tessa Rajak (1946), ancient historian, primarily focused on Judaism in the Hellenistic and Roman periods; expert on the writings of Josephus
Joyce Reynolds FBA (1918–2022), classicist and academic, specialising in Roman historical epigraphy; first woman awarded the Kenyon Medal
Christina Riggs, American historian, museum curator, and academic; specialises in the history of archaeology, photography, and ancient Egyptian art
Katherine Routledge (1866–1935), archaeologist and anthropologist who initiated the first true survey of Easter Island (leader of the Mana Expedition)
Susan Sherratt (1949), archaeologist of Bronze Age Greece, Cyprus, and the eastern Mediterranean
Maria Stamatopoulou, Greek classical archaeologist specialising in Central Greece, and Thessaly in particular
Margerie Venables Taylor (1881–1963), archaeologist and editor of the Journal of Roman Studies; held posts including Secretary for the Society for the Promotion of Roman Studies
Vivian Wade-Gery (1897–1988), classical archaeologist
Audrey Williams FSA (1902–1978), Welsh archaeologist; first woman president of the Royal Institution of South Wales
Katharine Woolley (1888–1945), archaeologist who worked principally at the Mesopotamian site of Ur; married to archaeologist Sir Leonard Woolley; inspiration for the murder victim in the novel Murder in Mesopotamia by Agatha Christie
Maria Wyke (1957), professor of Latin at UCL

Medievalists
Caroline Barron OBE (1940), medieval historian; granddaughter of David George Hogarth
Margaret Clunies Ross (1942), medievalist; main research areas are Old Norse-Icelandic studies
Ursula Dronke (1920–2012), medievalist and former Vigfússon Reader in Old Norse in Oxford
Antonia Gransden (1928/29–2020), historian and medievalist
Judith Green (1961), medieval historian, specialising in Anglo-Norman England
Elspeth Kennedy FSA (1921–2006), academic, prominent medievalist
Clare Kirchberger, Anglican nun and medievalist who edited and translated several works of Christian mysticism
May McKisack (1900–1981), medieval historian
Mildred Pope (1872–1956), scholar of Anglo-Norman England; first woman to hold a readership at Oxford University; the character Miss Lydgate in Sayers' Gaudy Night (1935) is based on Pope
Evelyn Procter FRHistS (1897–1980), historian and academic; served as principal of St Hugh's College, Oxford; first female scholar to be admitted to the National Historical Archive of Spain and the Biblioteca Nacional de España
Margaret Twycross FSA, historian specialising in medieval theatre and iconography
Teresa Webber FSA FRHistS FBA, palaeographer and medievalist

Law

Margaret Casely-Hayford (1959), lawyer and businesswoman; chair of the board of Shakespeare's Globe; former chair of ActionAid
Laeticia Kikonyogo (1940–2017), Ugandan lawyer and judge; rated the 6th most powerful person in Ugandan public life; first woman magistrate Grade I; first woman Chief Magistrate; first woman to be appointed High Court judge; first woman Deputy Chief Justice of Uganda; one of the first ever women papal knights in the history of the Catholic Church in Africa
Akua Kuenyehia (1947), Ghanaian lawyer; one of the only three female African judges at the International Criminal Court; first First Vice-president of that court
Nemone Lethbridge (1932), barrister and playwright; one of Britain's first female barristers and the first woman at Hare Court
Anne M. Lofaso (1965), law professor
Ann Olivarius (1955), American-British lawyer and Rhodes Scholar
Dame Judith Parker DBE QC (1950), judge and barrister; Queen's Counsel and Justice of the High Court of England and Wales
Anna Poole, Lady Poole QC, Senator of the College of Justice in Scotland
Cornelia Sorabji (1866–1954), first woman to practice law in India and Britain; first Indian national to study at any British university
Amy Wax (1953), American lawyer and academic; winner of the Lindback Award
Farhana Yamin (1965), lawyer, public speaker and climate activist

Linguistics and literature

Reem Bassiouney (1973), Egyptian author and professor of sociolinguistics; Sawiris Cultural Award winner
Janet Bately CBE FBA, academic and Professor Emeritus of English Language and Medieval Literature
Catherine Belsey (1940–2021), literary critic and academic
Sonia Bićanić OBE (1920–2017), literary academic, author and translator
Sarah Bilston, author and professor of English literature
Carmen Blacker FBA OST OBE (1924–2009), scholar of Japanese language
Lady Norma Dalrymple-Champneys (1902–1997), scholar of English literature; winner of the Rose Mary Crawshay Prize
Susie Dent (1964), lexicographer and etymologist; has appeared in "Dictionary Corner" on the Channel 4 game show Countdown since 1992
Una Ellis-Fermor (1894–1958), literary critic, author; described as "a major contributor to the study of the English Renaissance"; Rose Mary Crawshay Prize winner
Margery Fisher (1913–1992), literary critic and academic
Julia Gasper, independent academic specialising in historical literature; right-wing political activist affiliated with the English Democrats
Lorna Hutson FBA (1958), ninth Merton Professor of English Literature
Agnes Latham (1905–1996), academic, Professor of English at Bedford College
Dominica Legge FBA (1905–1986), scholar of the Anglo-Norman language and founding member of the Anglo-Norman Text Society
Anna Laura Lepschy (1933), Italian linguist; recipient of the Serena Medal
Joycelynne Loncke, Guyanese academic and musicologist; areas of interest include French literature and the history of music
Margaret Mann Phillips (1906–1987), academic who specialized in Renaissance literature and history
Vivien Noakes FRSL (1937–2011), biographer, editor and critic
Rebecca Posner (1929–2018), philologist, linguist and academic; specialized in Romance languages; President of the Philological Society
Dorjana Širola (1972), Croatian quizzer, linguist and anglicist; highest placed woman at the World Quizzing Championship in seven years; winner of University Challenge for Somerville
Emma Smith, Professor of Shakespeare Studies
Enid Starkie CBE (1897–1970), Irish literary critic known for her biographical works on French poets; Officer of the Legion of Honour
Kathleen Mary Tillotson (1906–2001), academic and literary critic, professor of English and distinguished Victorian scholar
Joan Turville-Petre (1911–2006), noted academic in the field of Anglo-Saxon, Icelandic and Scandinavian language studies
Rosemond Tuve (1903–1964), American scholar of English literature, specializing in Renaissance literature, in particular Edmund Spenser

Music

Harry Escott (1976), composer
Sarah Ioannides (1972), Greek Cypriot-Scottish-Australian conductor and Fulbright Scholar
Dame Emma Kirkby DBE (1949), soprano; one of the world's most renowned early music specialists; The Queen's Medal for Music winner
Joycelynne Loncke, Guyanese academic and musicologist; areas of interest include French literature and the history of music
Grace-Evangeline Mason (1994), composer of contemporary classical music
Elizabeth Norman McKay (1931–2018), musicologist, pianist and Lieder accompanist
Jean Redcliffe-Maud, Baroness Redcliffe-Maude (1904–1993), pianist

Other

Sunethra Bandaranaike (1943), Sri Lankan philanthropist and socialite; daughter of Prime Minister S. W. R. D. Bandaranaike
Sheila Cassidy (1937), doctor and torture survivor who brought to the attention of the UK public the widespread human rights abuses that were occurring in Chile in the 1970s
Eleanor Flexner (1908–1995), distinguished independent scholar and pioneer in what was to become the field of women's studies
Flora Grierson (1899–1966), publisher and co-owner of Samson Press
Amanda Harlech, Baroness Harlech (1959), fashion consultant; named to the International Best Dressed List Hall of Fame; wife of Francis Ormsby-Gore, 6th Baron Harlech
Emily Georgiana Kemp (1860–1939), adventurer; donated the Somerville College Chapel
Frances Lincoln (1945–2001), independent publisher of illustrated books; won a Woman of the Year award in 1995
Henrietta Phipps (1931–2016), landscape gardener
Joan Shelmerdine (1899–1994), publisher and co-owner of Samson Press
Edith Standen (1905–1998), American museum curator and military officer; one of the "Monuments Men"; Women's Caucus for Art Lifetime Achievement Award winner
Pamela Vandyke-Price (1923–2014), wine taster and writer; first British woman to write about wine and spirits; receiver of the Order of Agricultural Merit
Marion Wilberforce (1902–1995), Scottish aviator; one of the first eight members of the Air Transport Auxiliary; one of only two women pool commanders in the whole ATA
Beryl de Zoete (1879–1962), ballet dancer, orientalist, dance critic and dance researcher; also known as a translator of Italo Svevo and Alberto Moravia

Philosophers

Anita Avramides (1952), philosopher whose work focuses on the philosophy of language and the philosophy of the mind
Annette Baier (1929–2012), New Zealand philosopher and Hume scholar; well known also for her contributions to feminist philosophy and to the philosophy of mind
Susanne Bobzien FBA, German-born philosopher whose work focuses on logic & language, determinism & freedom, and ancient philosophy; first woman appointed a tutorial fellow at The Queen's College, Oxford
Sarah Broadie OBE FBA FRSE, professor at the University of St Andrews; specialises in ancient philosophy, with a particular emphasis on Aristotle and Plato
Patricia Churchland (1943), Canadian-American analytic philosopher, noted for her contributions to neurophilosophy and the philosophy of mind; winner of a MacArthur Fellowship
Philippa Foot FBA (1920–2010), philosopher and ethicist, creator of the trolley problem
Celia Green (1935), writer on philosophical skepticism and psychology
 Joanna Hodge PPE 1972- 1975 D.Phil 1982 Professor of Philosophy Emerita Manchester Metropolitan University : work on feminist materiality, phenomenology, deconstruction, embodiments
Hidé Ishiguro (c. 1935), Japanese analytic philosopher; expert on the philosopher Gottfried Wilhelm Leibniz
Martha Kneale (1909–2001), philosopher; President of the Aristotelian Society
Genevieve Lloyd (1941), Australian philosopher and feminist; first female Professor of Philosophy in Australia; author of The Man of Reason
Penelope Mackie, philosopher, Professor of Philosophy University of Nottingham work on modality and necessity 
Mary Midgley (1919–2018), moral philosopher
Michele Moody-Adams, African-American philosopher; first female and first African-American dean of Columbia University
Dame Iris Murdoch DBE (1919–1999), novelist and philosopher born in Ireland; twelfth on a list of The 50 greatest British writers since 1945; winner of the Booker Prize; author of Under the Net, listed in the Modern Library 100 Best Novels
Kathleen Nott FRSL (1905–1999), poet, novelist, critic, philosopher and editor
Hilda D. Oakeley (1867–1950), philosopher, educationalist and author; first Warden of the new Royal Victoria College; first woman to deliver McGill's annual university lecture
Susan Moller Okin (1946–2004), New Zealand liberal feminist political philosopher and author
Onora O'Neill, Baroness O'Neill of Bengarve CH CBE FRS FBA FMedSci (1941), philosopher; first female winner of the Berggruen Prize; crossbench member of the House of Lords; Principal of Newnham College, Cambridge
Eva Picardi (1948–2017), Italian philosopher

Politicians

Elsbeth Dimsdale CBE (1871–1949), health campaigner and Liberal politician; first woman to receive a college fellowship at the University of Cambridge; founder of the Royal Papworth Hospital
Eleanor Rathbone MP (1872–1946), independent MP; long-term campaigner for family allowance and for women's rights; member of the Rathbone family and Somerville's first MP
Shirley Williams, Baroness Williams of Crosby CH MP PC (1930), politician and academic who represents the Liberal Democrats; one of the "Gang of Four" rebels who founded the Social Democratic Party (SDP)

Conservatives
Nicola Blackwood, Baroness Blackwood of North Oxford (1979), Conservative Party politician, former MP
Thérèse Coffey MP (1971), Conservative Party politician; Deputy Prime Minister of the United Kingdom and Secretary of State for Health and Social Care
Sam Gyimah MP (1976), Conservative Party politician; former Minister for Universities, Science, Research and Innovation
Dame Lucy Neville-Rolfe, Baroness Neville-Rolfe DBE CMG (1953), Conservative politician; Chairman of Assured Food Standards
Dame Kathleen Ollerenshaw DBE (1912–2014), mathematician and politician; Lord Mayor of Manchester
Margaret Thatcher, Baroness Thatcher LG OM DStJ PC FRS HonFRSC (1925–2013), Iron Lady, Conservative politician and first female Prime Minister of the United Kingdom
Lena Townsend CBE (1911–2004), Conservative politician

Labour
Helen Goodman MP (1958), Labour Party politician
Nia Griffith MP (1956), Welsh Labour Party politician.
Mary Honeyball MEP (1952), Member of the European Parliament (MEP) for the Labour Party representing London
Margaret Jay, Baroness Jay of Paddington PC (1939), politician for the Labour Party; former BBC television producer and presenter; daughter of James Callaghan
Peggy Jay (1913–2008), Labour councillor
Dame Penelope Jessel DBE (1920–1996), Liberal Party politician
Leah L'Estrange Malone (1886–1951), politician; first female chair of Poale Zion in the UK
Jenny Manson (1948), British Jewish activist, author, former civil servant, Labour Party councillor and Chair of Jewish Voice for Labour
Mary O'Brien Harris (1865–1938), member of the London County Council and Fabian Society
Lucy Powell MP (1974), Labour and Co-operative politician; Manchester's first female Labour member of parliament; Shadow Secretary of State for Housing
Theresa Stewart (1930), Labour politician; first female leader of Birmingham City Council and Lord Mayor of Birmingham
Shirley Summerskill MP (1931), Labour Party politician and former government minister
Shriti Vadera, Baroness Vadera PC (1962), investment banker and politician; government minister and Chairwoman of Santander UK; first woman to head a major British bank; first woman and first person of colour to chair the Royal Shakespeare Company
Eirene White, Baroness White MP (1909–1999), Labour politician and journalist

International

Margaret Ballinger (1894–1980), South African politician, first President of the Liberal Party of South Africa, "Queen of the Blacks"; held considerable power in the government of South Africa
Indira Gandhi (1917–1984), Prime Minister of India, named "Woman of the Millennium" in an online poll organised by the BBC
Svava Jakobsdóttir (1930–2004), one of Iceland's foremost 20th-century authors and feminist politicians
Diana Josephson (1936-2006), first woman to lead the National Oceanic and Atmospheric Administration (NOAA) and first female Under Secretary of Commerce for Oceans and Atmosphere under Bill Clinton; Principal Deputy Assistant Secretary for Installations and Environments and director of the National Center for Atmospheric Research; winner of the Department of Commerce Gold Medal and Navy Distinguished Public Service Award
Adelaide Plumptre (1874–1948), Canadian activist, diplomat, and municipal politician in Toronto; first woman elected chair of the Canadian Red Cross, Toronto Board of Education; first woman to sit in the Toronto Board of Control
Radhabai Subbarayan (1891–1960), first female member of the Indian Council of States (Rajya Sabha)

Radio and television

Margaret Jay, Baroness Jay of Paddington PC (1939), politician for the Labour Party; former BBC television producer and presenter
Kara Miller, Jamaican creator of The Lifestylista; health & wellness expert; television host; writer & director working in film and television
Sarah Mulvey (1974–2010), commissioning editor and television producer
Nesta Pain (1905-1995), broadcaster and writer
Dame Esther Rantzen DBE (1940), journalist and television presenter, best known for presenting the hit BBC television series That's Life!; first woman to receive a Dimbleby Award from BAFTA
Mary Somerville (1897–1963), first director of BBC School Radio
Joanna Spicer CBE (1906–1992), television executive employed by the BBC; involved with discussions that lead to Civilisation and Doctor Who; "ran BBC Television single handed"
Anne Symonds (1917–2017), broadcaster for the BBC World Service; grandmother-in-law of Boris Johnson
Xand van Tulleken (1978), TV presenter with his identical twin brother Chris (Van Tulleken brothers)
Rebecca Wilcox (1980), television presenter, mainly for the BBC
Kate Williams (1978), author, historian and television presenter
Grace Wyndham Goldie (1900–1986), producer and executive in British television
Fasi Zaka (1974), Pakistani political commentator, columnist, radio talk show host, and television anchor; declared a Young Global Leader by the World Economic Forum

Religion
Constance Coltman (1889–1969), Britain's first woman to be an ordained minister
Peggy Jackson (1951), current and first female Archdeacon of Llandaff
Constance Langdon-Davies (1898 – 1954), one of the early Baháʼís in Britain
Christina Le Moignan (1942), Methodist minister and academic, who served as President of the Methodist Conference
Janet Soskice (1951), Canadian-born Catholic theologian and philosopher; her work has dealt with the role of women in Christianity

Missionaries
Audrey Donnithorne (1922–2020), British-Chinese political economist and missionary, prominent in her efforts to rebuild the Catholic Church in China after the Cultural Revolution for which she was awarded the Pro Ecclesia et Pontifice
Agnes de Selincourt (1872–1917), Christian missionary in India; responsible for the founding of missions; first Principal of Lady Muir Memorial College, Allahabad, India and then Principal of Westfield College, London
Margaret Wrong (1887-1948), Canadian educator, missionary administrator and Africanist; Margaret Wrong Prize for African Literature was established in her memory after her death

Royalty and nobility

Jane, Lady Abdy (1934–2015), English socialite and art dealer, described as one of the most original and respected art dealers of her generation
Lady Anne Brewis MBE (1911–2002), botanist; daughter of Roundell Palmer, 3rd Earl of Selborne
Amanda Harlech, Baroness Harlech (1959), fashion consultant; named to the International Best Dressed List Hall of Fame
Christine Longford, Countess of Longford (1900–1980), playwright; wife of Edward Pakenham, 6th Earl of Longford
Margaret Mackworth, 2nd Viscountess Rhondda (1883–1958), Welsh peeress, businesswoman, significant suffragette, RMS Lusitania survivor, first female director of the Institute of Directors, founder of Time and Tide and the Six Point Group
The Hon. Mary Anna Marten OBE (1929–2010), aristocrat and landowner who made legal history in the Crichel Down affair; goddaughter of Queen Elizabeth The Queen Mother; High Sheriff of Dorset; archaeologist
Lady Ottoline Morrell (1873–1938), aristocrat and society hostess; cousin of Queen Elizabeth The Queen Mother; her patronage was influential in artistic and intellectual circles; associated with the Bloomsbury Group; inspiration for several literary characters by Aldous Huxley, D. H. Lawrence, Graham Greene, Alan Bennett and Constance Malleson
Princess Catherine Hilda Duleep Singh (1871–1942), suffragist; daughter of Maharaja Duleep Singh
Queen Raja Zarith Sofiah (1959), Queen of Johor and member of the Perak Royal Family
Princess Bamba Sutherland (1869–1957), daughter of Maharaja Duleep Singh, last surviving member of the family that had ruled the Sikh Empire
Lady Juliet Townsend DCVO (1941–2014), writer, first female Lord Lieutenant of Northamptonshire
Elizabeth Young, Lady Kennet (1923–2014), writer, researcher, poet, artist, campaigner, analyst and questioning commentator

Scientists

Jane Kirkaldy (1869–1932), one of the first women to obtain first-class honours in the natural sciences; contributed greatly to the education of the generation of English women scientists
Margaret Seward MBE (1864–1939), first Oxford female student to be entered for the honour school of Mathematics; one of the first two female chemistry students at Oxford; earliest chemist on staff at the Royal Holloway (of which she was a founding lecturer); pioneer woman to obtain a first class in the honour school of Natural Science
Premala Sivaprakasapillai Sivasegaram (1942), Sri Lankan engineer, regarded as the country's first female engineer; acknowledged as one of twelve female change-makers in Sri Lanka by the parliament

Biologists
Dawn R. Bazely (1960), ecology and evolutionary biology professor
Victoria Braithwaite FLS FRIN (1967–2019), scientist who was the first person to demonstrate that fish feel pain; winner of the FSBI Medal
Dame Kay Davies DBE FRS FMedSci (1951), geneticist; Director of the MRC and Oxford Centre for Gene Function; governor of the Wellcome Trust
Valerie Todd Davies (1920), New Zealand arachnologist
Marian Dawkins CBE FRS (1945), biologist; professor of ethology; wife of Richard Dawkins
Marianne Fillenz (1924–2012), neuroscientist
Lilian Jane Gould FLS (1861–1936), biologist; one of the first women admitted to the Linnaean Society; one of the first European breeders of Siamese cats
Loeske Kruuk, evolutionary ecologist; winner of the Philip Leverhulme Prize
Rosalind Maskell FRCP (1928–2016), microbiologist known for her work on urinary tract infections
Dame Angela McLean DBE FRS (1961), professor of mathematical biology
Christine Nicol, Professor of Animal Welfare at the Royal Veterinary College; winner of the Prince Laurent Foundation prize; her work has contributed to EU ban on conventional battery cages for laying hens in 2012
Shirley Hodgson DM D(Obst) RCOG DCH FRCP FRSB (1945), geneticist
Elsie Maud Wakefield OBE (1886–1972), mycologist and plant pathologist
Rosie Woodroffe, ecologist and academic; winner of the Marsh Ecology Award

Botanists
Lady Anne Brewis MBE (1911–2002), botanist; daughter of Roundell Palmer, 3rd Earl of Selborne
Adeline May Cowan (1892–1981), botanist who was active in India
Emilia Frances Noel FLS (c. 1868–1950), botanist, author and illustrator
Edith Philip Smith FLS FRSE (1897–1976), Scottish botanist and teacher
Pat Wolseley (1938), botanist specialised in lichen

Chemists
Jenny Pickworth Glusker (1931), biochemist and crystallographer; winner of the Garvan–Olin Medal, John Scott Medal and William Procter Prize for Scientific Achievement
Rita Harradence (1915–2012), Australian biochemist who synthesised penicillamine; 1851 Exhibition Scholar
Pauline Harrison CBE (1926), protein crystallographer
Dame Julia Higgins DBE FRS FREng (1942), polymer scientist, winner of the Holweck Medal and Legion of Honour, President of the British Science Association, Institution of Chemical Engineers and Institute of Physics
Dorothy Hodgkin OM FRS HonFRSC (1910–1994), Nobel Prize winner for her discovery of the structure of Vitamin B12 and development of protein crystallography; first, and only, British woman to win a Nobel Prize in science; first woman to receive maternity pay at Oxford University and first female Chancellor of the University of Bristol
Judith Howard CBE FRS (1945), distinguished chemist and crystallographer
Margaret Jope (1913–2004), Scottish biochemist
Barbara Low (1920–2019), biochemist and biophysicist involved in discovering the structure of penicillin and the characteristics of other antibiotics
Mary Watson (1856–1933), one of the first two female chemistry students at Oxford

Earth scientists
Helen ApSimon CBE (1942), climatologist and academic; known for her research into the transport of radioactivity from the Chernobyl disaster
Mary Winearls Porter (1886–1980), crystallographer and geologist, known for her publications about ancient Roman architecture.

Mathematicians
Kathryn Chaloner (1954–2014), statistician
Anne Cobbe (1920–1971), mathematician
Jane Kister (1944–2019), mathematical logician and executive editor of Mathematical Reviews
Pamela Liebeck (1930–2012), mathematician and mathematics educator
Hilary Ockendon, applied mathematician and an expert on problems in fluid dynamics
Dame Kathleen Ollerenshaw DBE (1912–2014), mathematician, politician, Lord Mayor of Manchester
Caroline Series FRS (1951), mathematician; President of the London Mathematical Society; Whitehead Prize winner
Mary Wynne Warner (1932–1998), mathematician, specializing in fuzzy mathematics

Physicists
Joanna Haigh CBE FRS FRMetS (1954), physicist and academic; President of the Royal Meteorological Society
Jacqueline Mitton (1948), astronomer, writer, and media consultant; asteroid 4027 Mitton is named after her
Alexandra Olaya-Castro (1976), Colombian theoretical physicist; winner of the Maxwell Prize
Anne Tropper, physicist
Julia Yeomans FRS FInstP (1954), theoretical physicist and academic

Social scientists

Reem Bassiouney (1973), Egyptian author and professor of sociolinguistics; Sawiris Cultural Award winner
Gwendolen M. Carter (1906–1991), Canadian-American political scientist; one of the founders of African Studies in the United States; first female president of the African Studies Association; among the most widely known scholars of African affairs in the twentieth century
Ann Oakley (1944), sociologist, feminist, and writer; author of The Men's Room
Nandini Sundar (1967), Indian professor of sociology; recipient of the Infosys Prize for Social Sciences

Anthropologists

Brenda Beck (c. 1940), anthropologist and Tamil culture icon
Beatrice Blackwood (1889–1975), anthropologist; ran the Pitt Rivers Museum
Maria Czaplicka (1884–1921), Polish cultural anthropologist best known for her ethnography of Siberian shamanism; first woman to receive a Mianowski Scholarship and first female lecturer in anthropology at Oxford
Katherine Routledge (1866–1935), archaeologist and anthropologist who initiated the first true survey of Easter Island (leader of the Mana Expedition)
Mai Yamani (1956), independent scholar, author and anthropologist; first Saudi Arabian woman to obtain a M.St. and a D.Phil. from Oxford

Economists

Audrey Donnithorne (1922–2020), British-Chinese political economist and missionary, prominent in her efforts to rebuild the Catholic Church in China after the Cultural Revolution for which she was awarded the Pro Ecclesia et Pontifice
Rachel Glennerster CMG (1965), Chief Economist at the Department for International Development
Ursula Kathleen Hicks (1896–1985), Irish-born economist and academic
Dame Barbara Ward, Baroness Jackson of Lodsworth DBE (1914–1981), economist and writer interested in the problems of developing countries; winner of the Jawaharlal Nehru Award
Mary Kaldor CBE (1946), academic; current Professor of Global Governance at the LSE; daughter of Nicholas Kaldor
Utsa Patnaik, Indian Marxist economist
Frances Stewart (1940), professor emeritus of development economics; daughter of Nicholas Kaldor
Doreen Warriner (1904–1972), development economist, known chiefly for her role in rescuing refugees just before World War II
Alison Wolf, Baroness Wolf of Dulwich CBE (1949), economist and professor at KCL

Sport

Rosamund Dashwood (1924–2007), one of the top female masters (i.e. over 35) runners in Canadian history
Sophie Le Marchand (1988), cricketer
Jamie Powe (1995), cricketer
Mary Russell Vick (1922–2012), field hockey player
Smit Singh (1991), present National Record holder of India in skeet shooting
Dorjana Širola (1972), Croatian quizzer, linguist and anglicist; highest placed woman at the World Quizzing Championship in seven years; winner of University Challenge for Somerville
Claire Tomlinson (1944), highest-rated female polo player; first woman to win the County Cup and the Queen's Cup; first woman in the world to rise to five goals; first female player in The Varsity Polo Match; first female captain of the OUPC

Rowers
Fiona Freckleton (1960), rower; bronze medalist in women's pairs, World Rowing Championships, Vienna, 1991; competed at the 1992 Summer Olympics and 1993 World Rowing Championships
Jennifer Goldsack (1982), American rower; competed at the 2008 Summer Olympics
Luka Grubor (1973), Croatian rower; won a gold medal at the 2000 Summer Olympics
Patricia Reid (1964), rower; competed at the 1992 Summer Olympics; silver and bronze medalist at the 1986 Commonwealth Games

Spies
Jenifer Hart (1914–2005), academic and senior civil servant; accused of having been a spy for the Soviet Union
Daphne Park, Baroness Park of Monmouth CMG OBE FRSA (1921–2010), spy, clandestine senior controller in MI6; Principal of Somerville College
Phoebe Pool (1913–1971), art historian and spy for the Soviet Union

Translators

Anthea Bell OBE (1936–2018), translator of numerous literary works, especially children's literature, including Austerlitz and the French Asterix comics
Catherine Glyn Davies (1926–2007), Welsh historian of philosophy and linguistics; translator
Lucienne Hill (1923–2012), French-English translator and actor; winner of the Evening Standard Theatre Award and Tony Award
Emily Lorimer OBE (1881–1949), Anglo-Irish journalist, linguist, political analyst, and writer
Helen Waddell (1889–1965), Irish poet, translator and playwright; winner of the Benson Medal
Beryl de Zoete (1879–1962), ballet dancer, orientalist, dance critic and dance researcher; also known as a translator of Italo Svevo and Alberto Moravia

Fellows & staff

G. E. M. Anscombe FBA (1919–2001), analytic philosopher
David Barford FRS FMedSci, medical researcher
Annie Barnes (1903–2003), reader in French literature
Elise Jenny Baumgartel (1892–1975), German Egyptologist and prehistorian who pioneered the study of the archaeology of predynastic Egypt
Amita Baviskar, sociologist studying the cultural politics of environment and development in rural and urban India; awarded the Infosys Prize
Tony Bell FRS, physicist; winner of the Hoyle Medal and Prize, Eddington Medal and Hannes Alfvén Prize 
Margarete Bieber (1879–1978), Jewish German-American art historian, classical archaeologist and professor, second woman university professor in Germany
Käthe Bosse-Griffiths (1910–1998), German-born Egyptologist and writer in the Welsh language
Sarah Broom (1972–2013), New Zealand poet; the Sarah Broom Poetry Prize is named after her
Gráinne de Búrca FBA (1966), Irish legal scholar, specialising in European Union law
Nina Byers (1930–2014), theoretical physicist
Muriel St. Clare Byrne (1895–1983), historical researcher
Herman Cappelen (1967), Norwegian philosopher
April Carter (1937), peace activist; active in the anti-nuclear movement in the United Kingdom
Maude Clarke (1892–1935), Irish historian; first female to join Queen's University Belfast’s academic staff
Anne Cobbe (1920–1971), mathematician
Helen De Cruz (1978), Belgian philosopher
Henriette Dahan Kalev (1947), Israeli feminist theorist and political scientist; one of the founders of the Mizrahi feminist movement, and one of the leading theorists of Mizrahi feminism
Stephanie Dalley FSA (1943), scholar of the Ancient Near East
Lady Norma Dalrymple-Champneys (1902–1997, librarian), scholar of English literature; winner of the Rose Mary Crawshay Prize
Marian Dawkins CBE FRS (1945), biologist; professor of ethology; wife of Richard Dawkins
Helen DeWitt (1957), novelist; writer of The Last Samurai and Lightning Rods
Ursula Dronke (1920–2012), medievalist
Nan Dunbar (1928–2005), classicist.
Katherine Duncan-Jones FRSL (1941), literature and Shakespeare scholar
Jennifer Durrant RA (1942), artist-in-residence
Dorothy Emmet (1904–2000), philosopher; a founder member of the Epiphany Philosophers
Karin Erdmann (1948), German mathematician
Colin Espie FRSM FBPsS (1957), Scottish neuroscientist and Professor of Sleep Medicine 
Barbara Everett, academic and literary critic
Marc Feldmann AC FAA FRS FRCP FRCPath FMedSci (1944), Australian immunologist; winner of the Crafoord Prize, Lasker-DeBakey Clinical Medical Research Award, Cameron Prize for Therapeutics of the University of Edinburgh, Dr. Paul Janssen Award for Biomedical Research, Ernst Schering Prize and Canada Gairdner International Award.
Philippa Foot FBA (1920–2010), philosopher and creator of the trolley problem
Barbara Freire-Marreco (1879–1967), anthropologist and folklorist; one of the first two women to gain a Diploma in Anthropology at Oxford
Margery Fry (1874–1958), prison reformer; one of the first women to become a magistrate
Elspeth Garman (1954), professor of molecular biophysics; President of the British Crystallographic Association; the "Garman limit" is named after her; winner of the Suffrage Science award
Hilary Greaves (1978), philosopher
Charlotte Byron Green (1842–1929, Vice-President), promoter of women's education
Miriam T. Griffin (1935–2018), American classical scholar; held the first Women in Classics dinner (at Somerville College)
Grace Eleanor Hadow OBE (1875–1940), author, principal of St Anne's College, Oxford, and vice-chairman of the Women's Institute
Edith Hall (1959), scholar of classics, specialising in ancient Greek literature and cultural history
Helena Hamerow FSA (1961), Professor of Early Medieval Archaeology; former Head of the School of Archaeology at Oxford
Jenny Harrison (1949), American mathematician
Barbara Harvey (1928), medieval historian
Isobel Henderson (1906–1967), ancient historian; one of the first woman tutors to be allowed to join Oxford's 'Ancient History Dinners'
Gertrud Herzog-Hauser (1894–1953), Austrian classical philologist; first Austrian woman to gain a habilitation at university and Vienna’s first university lecturer in classical language.
James Higginbotham FBA (1941–2014), Vera Brittain Visiting Fellow, professor of Linguistics and philosophy
Dorothy Hodgkin OM FRS HonFRSC (1910–1994), Nobel Prize winner for her discovery of the structure of Vitamin B12 and development of protein crystallography; first, and only, British woman to win a Nobel Prize in science; first woman to receive maternity pay at Oxford University; first female Chancellor of the University of Bristol
Alan Hollinghurst FRSL (1954), English novelist, poet, short story writer and translator, winner of the James Tait Black Memorial Prize and Booker Prize
Margaret Hubbard (1924–2011), Australian-born British classical scholar specialising in philology; described as "one of the most distinguished classical scholars of the modern age"; one of St Anne's College's 15 founding fellows
David Hutchinson FInstP (1969), quantum physicist
Evelyn Jamison (1877–1972), medievalist
Louise Johnson DBE FRS (1940–2012), biochemist and protein crystallographer; winner of the Suffrage Science award; part of the team that discovered the structure of the enzyme lysozyme
Dame Carole Jordan DBE FRS FRAS FInstP (1941), physicist, astrophysicist, astronomer and academic
Jane Kister (1944–2019), mathematical logician and executive editor of Mathematical Reviews
Lotte Labowsky (1905–1991), exiled Jewish German classicist
Aditi Lahiri (1952), India born German linguist
Claire Lamont (1942), specialist in the works of Jane Austen and Sir Walter Scott; winner of the Rose Mary Crawshay Prize
Mary Lascelles FBA (1900–1995), literary scholar
Irene Lemos FSA, classical archaeologist specialising in the Late Bronze Age and Early Iron Age of Greece
Chris Lintott FRAS (1980), astronomer
Mary Lobel (1900–1993, librarian), historian who edited several volumes of the Victoria County History
Emily Lorimer OBE (1881–1949), Anglo-Irish journalist, linguist, political analyst, and writer
Hilda Lorimer (1873–1954), classical scholar; one of the first three women to participate in an excavation conducted by the British School at Athens
Jonathan Marchini (1973), Bayesian statistician and professor of statistical genomics
Faith Martin (secretary), pen name of English author Jacquie Walton best known for her detective series
Anita Mehta, Indian physicist
Dame Anna Morpurgo Davies DBE FSA FBA (1937–2014), Italian philologist
Hilary Ockendon, applied mathematician and an expert on problems in fluid dynamics
Daphne Osborne (1930–2006), botanist
Patricia Owens (1975), British-Irish academic, author and professor in International Relations
Clara Pater (1841–1910), language and literature scholar; pioneer and early reformer of women's education; tutor of Virginia Woolf
Valerie Pearl (1926–1916), historian, President of New Hall, Cambridge
Dame Emily Penrose DBE (1858–1942), Principal of Royal Holloway College, Bedford College and Somerville College; first woman to gain a First in Greats (Classics) at Oxford
Bertha Phillpotts (1877–1932), scholar in Scandinavian languages, literature, history, archaeology and anthropology
Antoinette Pirie (1905–1991), biochemist, ophthalmologist, and educator
Mildred Pope (1872–1956), scholar of Anglo-Norman England; first woman to hold a readership at Oxford University; the character Miss Lydgate in Sayers' Gaudy Night (1935) is based on Pope
Mary Winearls Porter (1886–1980), crystallographer and geologist, known for her publications about ancient Roman architecture
Mason Porter, American mathematician and physicist; winner of the Erdős–Rényi Prize and Whitehead Prize
Tessa Rajak (1946), ancient historian, primarily focused on Judaism in the Hellenistic and Roman periods; expert on the writings of Josephus
Tobias Reinhardt (1971), German classical scholar, specialising in Latin literature and ancient philosophy
Alex Rogers, professor of conservation biology
Bridget Rosewell OBE FAcSS (1951), economist
Peter Rutledge, New Zealand chemist
Susan M. Scott FAA, Australian physicist whose work concerns general relativity, gravitational singularities, and black holes; first female physicist to win the Prime Minister's Prize for Science
Rose Sidgwick (1877–1918), one of the founders of the International Federation of University Women
Steven H. Simon (1967), American theoretical physicist; LeRoy Apker Award and Royal Society Wolfson Research Merit Award winner
Mary Snow (1902–1978), botanist who contributed to the study of geotropism and phyllotaxis
Charles Spence (1969), experimental psychologist
Fiona Stafford FBA, Professor of English Language and Literature
Phyllis Starkey (1947), Labour party politician
Enid Starkie CBE (1897–1970), Irish literary critic known for her biographical works on French poets; officer of the Legion of Honour
Frances Stewart (1940), professor emeritus of development economics; daughter of Nicholas Kaldor
Mary Stocks, Baroness Stocks (1891–1975), writer who was deeply involved in women's suffrage, the welfare state, and other aspects of social work
Martin Suckling (1981), composer and violinist
Dame Lucy Sutherland DBE FBA FRSA (1903–1980), Australian-born historian and head of Lady Margaret Hall, Oxford
Rachel Tanner, immunologist; winner of the 'Women of the Future' Award for Science in 2019
Jenny Teichman (1930–2018), Australian/British philosopher, writing mostly on ethics
Rajesh Thakker (1954), Professor of Medicine
Angela Vincent FRS FMedSci (1942), neuroscientist
Timothy Walker (1958), botanist, Horti Praefectus (Director) of the University of Oxford Botanic Garden and Harcourt Arboretum
Doreen Warriner (1904–1972), development economist, known chiefly for her role in rescuing refugees just before World War II
Kevin Warwick FIET FCGI (1954), engineer and Deputy Vice-Chancellor (Research) at Coventry University; known for his studies on direct interfaces between computer systems and the human nervous system; winner of the IET Mountbatten Medal, Ellison–Cliffe Medal and Golden Eurydice Award
Dame Veronica Wedgwood OM DBE FBA FRHistS (1910–1997), historian specializing in the history of 17th-century England and Continental Europe; winner of the James Tait Black Memorial Prize and the Goethe Medal; President of the English Association
Jennifer Welsh (1965), Canadian researcher, writer and consultant; United Nations Secretary-General’s Special Adviser on the Responsibility to Protect
Stephanie West FBA, classical scholar
Hilary Davan Wetton, Senior Music Associate, conductor
Deirdre Wilson FBA (1941), linguist and cognitive scientist
Rosemary Woolf (1925–1978), scholar of medieval literature
Dorothy Maud Wrinch (1894–1976), mathematician and biochemical theorist; first female Lecturer in Mathematics at Oxford and first woman to receive an Oxford DSc
Leonie Zuntz (1908–1942), German Hittitologist, included in The Black Book

Honorary fellows

Notable honorary fellows (excluding alumni) are Vijaya Lakshmi Pandit, Nancy Rothwell, and Kiri Te Kanawa. Notable foundation fellows are Charles Powell, Baron Powell of Bayswater, and Wafic Saïd.

Principals

The first principal of Somerville Hall was Madeleine Shaw-Lefèvre (1879–1889). The first principal of Somerville College was Agnes Catherine Maitland (1889–1906) when in 1894 it became the first of the five women's halls of residence to adopt the title of 'college', the first of them to appoint its own teaching staff, the first to set an entrance examination, and the first to build a library. She was succeeded by classical scholar Emily Penrose (1906–1926), who established the Mary Somerville Research Fellowship in 1903 which was the first to offer women in Oxford opportunities for research. Alumnae Margery Fry (1926–1930), Helen Darbishire (1930–1945), Janet Vaughan (1945–1967), Barbara Craig (1967–1980) and Daphne Park, Baroness Park of Monmouth (1980–1989) also served as Principal of Somerville College.

The current principal is Janet Royall, Baroness Royall of Blaisdon. She succeeded Alice Prochaska at the end of August 2017.

References

Bibliography

Lists of people associated with the University of Oxford
People associated with Somerville College, Oxford